Connor Hall may refer to:

Places
Connor Hall (Santa Fe, New Mexico), listed on the U.S. National Register of Historic Places

People
Connor Hall (tenor), singer in The Homeland Harmony Quartet
Connor Hall (ice hockey player), drafted by the Pittsburgh Penguins
Connor Hall (footballer, born 1998), for Chorley
Connor Hall (footballer, born 1993), for Harrogate Town